Moravské naftové doly (MND) is a Czech oil and gas producing company based in Hodonín, Czech Republic, producing  of oil and 250,000 m3 of gas per day. With gas storage facilities of 180 million m3, MND is an important player on European gas market. MND has also a retail and trading unit. KKCG company is the sole shareholder.

The company also operates many assets overseas, for example gas and oil fields in Georgia or gas storages in Germany.

In September 2007, MND signed a contract with Regal Petroleum to buy a 50% stake in a major Ukrainian gas field for US$330 million.

See also

 Energy in the Czech Republic

References

External links 
 Official site

Oil and gas companies of the Czech Republic
Czech brands